The Trausi (Herod., Trausoi) or Thrausi (Liv.) were a Thracian tribe who inhabited the southwestern region of the Rhodopes. 

Herodotus writes of the Trausi:

"The Trausi in all else resemble the other Thracians, but have customs at births and deaths which I will now describe. When a child is born all its kindred sit round about it in a circle and weep for the woes it will have to undergo now that it is come into the world, making mention of every ill that falls to the lot of humankind; when, on the other hand, a man has died, they bury him with laughter and rejoicings, and say that now he is free from a host of sufferings, and enjoys the completest happiness." (Histories, 5.4)

The ethnonym Trausi (Thrausi) may derive from Trauos, the name of a river.  An etymology found in Duridanov's paper derives the tribe name from an adjective, meaning "The Crumblers" or "The Shatterers", deriving from PIE *dhreu-, 'to crumble, grind' (Pokorny, pg. 274-275). The Ancient Greek verb thrauô, 'to break in pieces, shatter', would be a cognate (from thrauô is formed Ancient Greek thrausai, aor. opt. act. 3rd sg., and thrausoi).

Ancient tribes in Bulgaria
Ancient tribes in Thrace
Thracian tribes
Tribes described primarily by Herodotus